Aron van Lare (born 5 January 2003) is a Dutch professional footballer who plays as a goalkeeper for Eerste Divisie club NAC Breda.

References

2003 births
Living people
Dutch footballers
Jong PSV players
NAC Breda players
Eerste Divisie players
Association football goalkeepers